Évry FC  is a French association football club founded in 2012 by the merger of L'Association Sportive Évry Football (founded in 1898) and Ville d'Evry Sport Club. They are based in Évry, France and currently play at level 8 (Regional 3, Paris Île-de-France) of the French football league system. They play at the Stade Jean-Louis Moulin in Évry.

Notable coaches 
 Bernard Touret (1996–2011)

References 

Football clubs in France
Association football clubs established in 2012
2012 establishments in France
Évry, Essonne
Sport in Essonne
Football clubs in Île-de-France